This is a list of diseases of foliage plants belonging to the family Commelinaceae.

Plant Species

Fungal diseases

Nematodes, parasitic

Viral diseases

References
Viruses Infecting Wild and Cultivated Species of the Commelinaceae
Characterization and Electron Microscopy of a Potyvirus Infecting Commelina diffusa. Commelina mosaic virus
Commelina mosaic virus
Characterization of a Potyvirus Causing a Leaf Distortion Disease of Trandescantia and Zebrina Species
Trandescantia mosaic virus
Brome Mosaic Virus Isolates Naturally Infecting Commelina diffusa and C. communis 
Mosaic Disease of Rhoeo discolor Caused by a Strain of Tobacco Mosaic Virus
Tobacco mild green mosaic virus(U2-TMV)
A Lethal Disease of Tomato Experimentally Induced by RNA-5 Associated with Cucumber Mosaic Virus Isolated from Commelina from El Salvador

Foliage plant (Commelinaceae)